Chamaesphecia thracica is a moth of the family Sesiidae. It is found in Italy and most of the Balkan Peninsula. It is also found from Asia Minor to the Middle East.

The larvae feed on Stachys shirkei and Stachys germanica.

References

Moths described in 1983
Sesiidae
Moths of Europe
Moths of Asia